Razzia sur la chnouf (French for "Raid on the Dope") is a 1955 French gangster film directed by Henri Decoin that stars Jean Gabin, Lino Ventura, Lila Kedrova and Magali Noël. The screenplay, based on a novel by Auguste Le Breton, explores the contemporary drug scene in Paris and the efforts of the police to limit it. The film was released as Razzia in the United States, distributed by Kassler Films Inc. with English subtitles by Herman G. Weinberg.

Plot
After a spell in the US, master criminal Henri "le Nantais" returns to Paris and is recruited by Paul Liski, head of a major narcotics ring, to improve efficiency of distribution. Merchandise has been disappearing and unreliable dealers must be eliminated. For the latter purpose he is assigned two hit men, Catalan and Bibi. As his cover, he is made manager of a restaurant, Le Troquet, much favoured by the underworld. As soon as he walks in, he catches the eye of the cashier, Lisette, who resolves to be his girl. The first task he is given is a courier who wants out, not understanding that there is only one way to leave the organisation: Catalan and Bibi quickly eliminate him. Then he visits a laboratory, whose courier has been dealing on the side and is quickly dealt with by the two hit men. Deciding that the laboratory is compromised, Henri himself takes its entire stock to the port of Le Havre, to be shipped overseas. Later, the organisation is shocked to learn that French police found the whole consignment.

Police pressure intensifies, with a raid on Le Troquet in which staff and customers are all taken in for questioning. They exempt Lisette, who has moved into Henri's apartment upstairs and has been given a number to ring if Henri's life is in danger. Freed, he continues his investigations into weak links, visiting among other sordid spots a Chinese opium den and a club for black marijuana smokers. When Catalan and Bibi are sent on a job, they walk into a police ambush and escape wounded, after killing two cops. They rush round to Le Troquet, where Lisette overhears their story, and Henri decides that Paul must solve this problem. When the three go to his house, he gives them a map and the keys to a country hideaway; Driving there straight away, they are looking for food and drink when the house is surrounded by police and in a gun battle Catalan and Bibi are killed. The police, who had been alerted by Lisette, take the lightly wounded Henri back to headquarters, where the whole drug ring from Paul downwards has been arrested. Revealing himself to be an undercover police inspector, Henri looks forward to interrogating them.

Cast 
 Jean Gabin: Henri "le Nantais" Ferré
 Magali Noël: Lisette, the cashier
 Lino Ventura: Roger "le Catalan", hitman
 Albert Rémy: Bibi, hitman
 Paul Frankeur: Police Commissioner Fernand
 Pierre-Louis: Inspector LeRoux
 Marcel Dalio: Paul Liski, boss of the drug ring
 Roland Armontel: Louis Birot, drug processor
 Jacqueline Porel: Solange Birot, his wife
 Michel Jourdan: Marcel, a pusher
 Jo Peignot: Manager of the Pushers
 Andre Weber: Li Chiang, a pusher
 Lila Kedrova: Léa, an addict
 Josselin: Fredo, a pusher
 Leopoldo Frances: Assumpcion, speakeasy operator-pusher
 Auguste Le Breton: Auguste "Le Breton", a gangster

References

External links
 
 
Film page at Box Office Story (French)
  Razzia sur la chnouf at “Cinema-francais“ (French)
 Razzia movie review at The New York Times Last accessed: July 3, 2014.

1955 films
1955 crime films
French black-and-white films
Film noir
1950s French-language films
French gangster films
Films set in Paris
Films about organized crime in France
Films about the illegal drug trade
Films based on French novels
Films based on works by Auguste Le Breton
1950s French films